John Almond (21 November 1915 – 1993) was an English footballer who played in the Football League for Stoke City and Tranmere Rovers.

Career
Almond joined Stoke City from Prescot Cables in 1934. He played as a reserve, failing to dislodge Joe Johnson – an England international – from the outside left position. His only goal for Stoke came on his league debut in a 2–1 defeat at Wolverhampton Wanderers in April 1935.

Almond joined Tranmere Rovers in 1936 and finished his career with Shrewsbury Town where he was a regular first-team player scoring goals consistently in the Birmingham & District League for two seasons.

Career statistics

References

English footballers
Prescot Cables F.C. players
Stoke City F.C. players
Tranmere Rovers F.C. players
Shrewsbury Town F.C. players
English Football League players
1915 births
1993 deaths
Association football wingers